Gamiz may refer to two surnames: Gámiz and Gamíz.

Notable people with the surname Gámiz include:
Andrea Gámiz (born 1992), Venezuelan tennis player
 (1528–1588), Spanish sculptor
Roberto Carlos Reyes Gámiz (born 1969), Mexican politician
Sergio Gámiz (born 1978), Spanish footballer

Notable people with the surname Gamíz include:
Luis Gamíz (born 2000), Mexican footballer